1st Street station is an at-grade light rail station on the A Line of the Los Angeles Metro Rail system. The station is located in the median of Long Beach Boulevard at its intersection with 1st Street, after which the station is named, in Long Beach, California. The station is on a loop at the south end of the A Line route and only has southbound service.

During the 2028 Summer Olympics, the station will serve spectators traveling to and from venues located at the Long Beach Sports Park including handball at the Long Beach Arena, temporary facilities for BMX and water polo, along with marathon swimming and triathlon in Long Beach harbor.

Service

Station layout

Hours and frequency

Connections 
, the following connections are available: 
Long Beach Transit: 
Los Angeles Metro Bus:  ,

Notable places nearby 
Long Beach Convention and Entertainment Center
Long Beach Terrace Theater

References

External links

A Line (Los Angeles Metro) stations
Transportation in Long Beach, California
Railway stations in the United States opened in 1990
1990 establishments in California